The 2005 Scottish Challenge Cup final, also known as the Bell's Cup final for sponsorship reasons, was an association football match between St Mirren and Hamilton Academical on 6 November 2005 at Excelsior Stadium in Airdrie. It was the 15th final of the Scottish Challenge Cup since it was first organised in 1990 to celebrate the centenary of the Scottish Football League.

St Mirren emerged winners after defeating Hamilton Academical 2–1 with goals from Simon Lappin and John Sutton to win the tournament for the first time after being losing finalists in 1993.

Route to the final

St Mirren 

The first round draw paired St Mirren with Forfar Athletic at Love Street with the home team winning 1–0 after extra time. The second round was a trip to Dumfries to face Queen of the South at Palmerston Park with The Buddies producing 2–1 win to progress to the quarter-finals. The opponents drawn were Stenhousemuir at home in the quarter-finals and St Mirren won 3–2. The reward for reaching the semi-final was a home game at against Renfrewshire rivals, Greenock Morton with St Mirren edging out the opponents to win 4–2 on penalties after 0–0 after extra time. St Mirren reached the Scottish Challenge Cup final for the second time, since losing the 1993 final against Falkirk.

Hamilton Academical 

Hamilton Academical were drawn against Queen's Park at home in the first round and Hamilton came out 3–0 winners The second round draw saw Accies drawn against Ross County away from home with Hamilton emerging 1–0 winners. The quarter-final draw brought Dundee to New Douglas Park which saw Hamilton produce a 2–0 and awarded Accies their third consecutive clean sheet of the tournament to progress to the semi-finals. The opposition provided in the semi-final draw was St Johnstone and another away game which saw Hamilton triumph with a 2–1 victors to proceed to the Scottish Challenge Cup final for the third time in the club's history since winning both the 1991 and 1992 tournaments.

Match

References

2005
St Mirren F.C. matches
Hamilton Academical F.C. matches
Challenge Cup Final
November 2005 sports events in the United Kingdom